The Río Grande de Santiago, or Santiago River, is a river in western Mexico. It flows westwards from Lake Chapala via Ocotlán through the states of Jalisco and Nayarit to empty into the Pacific Ocean.

Geography
The river begins at  Lake Chapala via Ocotlán and continues roughly north-west through the Sierra Madre Occidental, receiving the Verde, Juchipila, Bolaños, Huaynamota, Mololoa, and other tributaries.

The Río Grande de Santiago descends over 1700 meters between Lake Chapala and the sea. Downstream from Lake Chapala the river and its major tributaries have carved deep narrow canyons, or barrancas, which can be 600 meters lower than the surrounding plateau. The lower elevation and year-round moisture in the canyon bottoms sustain forests, which include many coastal tropical species not found on the plateaus. The Barranca de Oblatos or Barranca de Huentitán is a protected area popular with residents of the city of Guadalajara, which lies on the plateau immediately south of the barranca.

At La Yesca, the La Yesca Dam was completed in 2012 and the El Cajón Dam was completed downstream in 2007. Below El Cajón, the Aguamilpa Dam was completed in 1993, creating a reservoir covering a large part of the territory of the municipality of El Nayar in Nayarit.

The Santiago River alone is reported to be 269 miles long. It is viewed by some sources as a continuation of the Lerma River, which flows into Lake Chapala and at 466 miles long is one of Mexico's longest rivers. Together the Lerma–Santiago river system is a little over 600 miles long.

Fauna
The remote chub (Algansea avia), mountain chub (Algansea monticola), and Chapala catfish (Ictalurus ochoterenai) are endemic to the Río Grande de Santiago and its tributaries.

Pollution
Mexico possesses a small percentage (0.1%) of the world's freshwater reserve. According to an article named Water use (and abuse) and its effects on the crater-lakes of Valle de Santiago, Mexico “most Mexican lakes are in an advanced state of desiccation or senescence, with volumes and surface area greatly reduced because of human activities”. Some examples of these damaging activities are wood cutting, inflow diversion for agriculture, groundwater over extraction, pollution and eutrophication. 

Less than fifty years ago the river was a place to fish, bathe, and swim.  It is now a river full of pollutants. The Instituto Mexicano de Tecnología del Agua (IMTA) found over a thousand different chemicals in the main channel and its tributaries. These substances included semi-volatile and volatile organic compounds, such as phthalates (hormonal disruptors), phenols (compounds that affect neuronal development), toluene (a neurotoxin), and carcinogenic flame retardants. This river is one of the most polluted in Mexico.

In February 2008 an eight-year-old boy, Miguel Angel Lopez Rocha, died after he fell into the river. Rocha fell near the El Salto Falls. He died nineteen days later. His autopsy indicated heavy metal poison was the reason for his death. This brought attention to the severe contamination of the river. After this unfortunate incident the local community organized a group called "Un Salto de Vida" ("A Leap for Life"), which sponsored the second National Assembly on Environmental Impacts held in El Salto in May 2009.

See also
List of longest rivers of Mexico

References

External links 
 Water Resources Atlas

Rivers of Jalisco
Rivers of Nayarit